Bwe or BWE may refer to: 
 Beneficiary Web Enrollment
 Bwe people or Kayaw, an ethnic group in Myanmar
 Bwe language or Bghai, a Karen language of Burma
 Brainwave entrainment, the hypothesized capacity of the brain to synchronize with external stimuli
 Braunschweig Wolfsburg Airport, IATA airport code BWE